The 1988 United States Senate election in Utah took place on November 8, 1988, concurrently with the U.S. presidential election as well as other elections to United States Senate and United States House of Representatives as well as various state and local elections. Republican Orrin Hatch won re-election against Democratic challenger Brian Moss, the son of Hatch's predecessor Frank Moss.

General election

Candidates
William M. Arth (Socialist Workers)
Orrin Hatch, incumbent Senator (Republican)
Brian Moss, son of former U.S. Senator Frank Moss (Democratic)
Robert J. Smith (American)

Results

See also
1988 United States Senate elections

References

1988
United States Senate
Utah